Bhind Assembly constituency is one of the 230 Vidhan Sabha (Legislative Assembly) constituencies of Madhya Pradesh state in central India. This constituency came into existence in 1951, as one of the 79 Vidhan Sabha constituencies of the erstwhile Madhya Bharat state.

Overview
Bhind (constituency number 10) is one of the 5 Vidhan Sabha constituencies located in Bhind district. This constituency covers part of Bhind tehsil, Akoda nagar panchayat and Bhind municipality.

Bhind is part of Bhind Lok Sabha constituency along with seven other Vidhan Sabha segments, namely, Ater, Lahar, Mehgaon and Gohad in this district and Sewda, Bhander and Datia in Datia district.

Members of Legislative Assembly

References

Bhind district
Assembly constituencies of Madhya Pradesh